Hydrolea ovata is a species of flowering plant known by the common names ovate false fiddleleaf and blue waterleaf. It is native to the southeastern United States.

This rhizomatous perennial herb has spiny stems growing up to 2 feet tall. The spiny, alternately arranged leaves are oval in shape. The flowers are blue.

This is a wetland species. It grows near ponds, ditches, and other wet sites. It is used in wetland restoration projects.

References

External links

Solanales
Flora of the Southeastern United States
Plants described in 1833
Flora of Arkansas